Melanohalea subverruculifera is a species of lichen in the family Parmeliaceae. Found in China, it was first formally described as a new species in 1980 as Parmelia subverruculifera. It was transferred to the segregate genus Melanelia in 1991, and then to the genus Melanohalea in 2004.

The lichen grows on a variety of substrates, including trees, rocks, and soil. It has a dark gray or black color and features a number of small, wart-like structures on its surface. These structures give the lichen its distinctive appearance and help to distinguish it from other species within its genus.

Melanohalea subverruculifera is an important part of many forest ecosystems. It provides a habitat for a number of different animals and plays a role in the nutrient cycling process within the forest. Additionally, it is thought to have medicinal properties and has been used by various indigenous communities throughout history for this purpose.

References

subverruculifera
Lichen species
Lichens described in 1980
Lichens of China
Taxa named by Ana Crespo
Taxa named by David Leslie Hawksworth
Taxa named by Helge Thorsten Lumbsch